Mieszkowice  is a village in the administrative district of Gmina Prudnik, within Prudnik County, Opole Voivodeship, in southern Poland, close to the Czech border.

The village has a population of 489.

History
In the 10th century the area became part of the emerging Polish state, and later on, it was part of Poland, Bohemia (Czechia), Prussia, and Germany. After the defeat of Germany in World War II, in 1945, the area became again part of Poland.

References

Mieszkowice